Alberto Closas Lluró (30 October 1921, in Barcelona – 19 September 1994, in Madrid) was a prolific Spanish  film actor who appeared in the Cinema of Argentina in the 1940s and 1950s and in Spanish cinema after 1955.

His family emigrated to Argentina in 1936 during the Spanish Civil War where in 1942 he acted in his first film Nada más que amor. He made over 90 film and television appearances and he continued to appear on Spanish television until his death in September 1994 from lung cancer.

He was married to Argentine actress Amelia Bence between 1950 and 1955.

Filmography

"Compuesta y sin novio" (1 episode, 1994)
"Farmacia de guardia" (1 episode, 1994)
Maestro de esgrima, El (1992) .... Álvaro Salanova
"Sóc com sóc" (1990) TV Series .... Carles Ribalta
Esquilache (1989) .... Duque de Villasanta
"Gatos en el tejado" (5 episodes, 1988)
De halcones y palomas (1986)
"Goya" (1985) (mini) TV Series
Últimas tardes con Teresa (1984)
"Cuatro hombres para Eva" (1984) TV Series
"Anillos de oro" .... Antonio (1 episode, 1983)
Divorcio que viene, El (1980) .... Pedrizosa
Familia, bien, gracias, La (1979) .... Carlos
Rabona, La (1979)
 Two Men and Two Women Amongst Them (1977)
Bodas de cristal (1975)
"Estudio 1" (1 episode, 1973)
Experiencia prematrimonial (1972)
"Cuatro historias de alquiler" (1971) TV Series
Hombre solo, Un (1969)
 Blood in the Bullring  (1969)
Taxi de los conflictos, El (1969) .... El atracador
Día es un día, Un (1968)
"Doce caras de Juan, Las" .... Juan (10 episodes, 1967)
Chicos del Preu, Los (1967)
De cuerpo presente (1967)
Viudas, Las (1966) .... segment 'El aniversario'
Operación Plus Ultra (1966)
Monnaie de singe (1966) .... Le baron Bullourde
Muere una mujer (1965) .... Javier
Familia y... uno más, La (1965)
Assassinio made in Italy (1965)
Diablo también llora, El (1965) .... Fernando Quiroga
Visita que no tocó el timbre, La (1965) .... Santiago
Casi un caballero (1964) .... Alberto
Piso de soltero (1964)
Operación: Embajada (1963)
"Canciones infantiles" (1963) TV Series
La Gran Familia (1962) .... Carlos, el padre
Solteros de verano (1962)
Usted puede ser un asesino (1961)
Navidades en junio (1960) .... Dr. Julio Medina
María, matrícula de Bilbao (1960)
El traje de oro (1960)
Cielo dentro de la casa, El (1960)
Baile, El (1959) .... Pedro
Gran señora, Una (1959)
Charlestón (1959)
Muchachita de Valladolid, Una (1958) .... Patricio
Distrito quinto (1958)
Pasado te acusa, El (1958) .... Piero
"Ese no sé qué de Casanova" (1958) TV Series
Tesoro en el cielo, Un (1957)
 We're All Necessary (1956)
Vida en un bloc, La (1956)
Fierecilla domada, La (1956) .... Don Beltrán de Lara
Muerte de un ciclista (1955) .... Juan Fernandes Soler
Ensayo final (1955)
Tren internacional (1954)
Dama del mar, La (1954)
Mi viudo y yo (1954)
En carne viva (1954)
Ídolo, El (1952)
Mi mujer está loca (1952)
 The Honourable Tenant (1951) .... Luis Ayala
Vivir un instante (1951)
Cuidado con las mujeres (1951)
Pies descalzos (1950)
Campeón a la fuerza (1950)
Vendedora de fantasías, La (1950)
Romance en tres noches (1950)
Otro yo de Marcela, El (1950)
Danza del fuego, La (1949)
 Story of a Bad Woman (1948) 
Gran tentación, La (1948)
Tierra del fuego (1948)
Gata, La (1947)
27 millones (1947)
Cristina (1946)
 María Rosa (1946)
 The Sin of Julia (1946)
Honra de los hombres, La (1946)
Encrucijada (1946)
La pródiga (1945)
Relegado de Pichintún, El (1943)
P'al otro lado (1942)
Nada más que amor (1942)

External links
 

1921 births
1994 deaths
Spanish male film actors
Argentine male film actors
Male actors from Barcelona
Deaths from lung cancer in Spain
Spanish emigrants to Argentina
20th-century Spanish male actors
20th-century Argentine male actors